Stephen Evans (born c.1943) is a British pharmacoepidemiologist and medical statistician,  professor of pharmacoepidemiology at the London School of Hygiene & Tropical Medicine (LSHTM).

Evans earned a bachelor's degree in physics and chemistry, and a master's in medical statistics from LSHTM.

Evans worked in statistics and computing at The London Hospital and Medical College for 25 years, leaving there in 1995 as Professor of Medical Statistics.

He was president of the International Society for Pharmacoepidemiology for 2010/2011, and a member of the statistics expert group for the Infected Blood Inquiry.

References

Living people
British epidemiologists
Academics of the London School of Hygiene & Tropical Medicine
British statisticians
Year of birth missing (living people)
1940s births